Çakmak, also known as Çerkes Çakmağı or Muhacirincedit, is a village in the Nurdağı District, Gaziantep Province, Turkey. The village is inhabited by Circassians, Alevi Kurds and Sunni Turks, and had a population of 192 in 2022. Circassian tribes populating the village are Abzakhs, Kabardians, and Shapsugs.

References

Villages in Nurdağı District
Kurdish settlements in Gaziantep Province